The Coast Guard Mutual Assistance (CGMA) is an independent non-profit charitable organization of the United States Coast Guard. As the official relief society of the United States Coast Guard, the organization assists those within the Coast Guard family. That includes active duty and retired military members, Coast Guard civilian employees, Coast Guard Reserve, Coast Guard Auxiliary, Public Health Service officers serving with the Coast Guard, and surviving family members. It has provided more than $200 million in financial assistance since 1924. There are more than 400 CGMA Representatives at 96 shore units and 38 cutters based in 32 states and territories, including Puerto Rico and Guam. CGMA receives no federal funds, and relies on bequests and donations from Coast Guard people. Most assistance is provided through interest-free loans and personal grants. These include educational support for members and their dependents,  emergency travel, temporary living expenses, funeral expenses, loss of funds or property, disaster relief, medical and dental expenses, home studies expenses for adoptions, and debt management. CGMA has a four-star rating from Charity Navigator.

The Supplemental Education Grant (SEG) program was enhanced in 2015. There is also a Layette Program to welcome infants. In 2017, CGMA provided 6 million dollars in direct assistance (loans and grants) to its clients.

During the 2018-2019 United States federal government shutdown, CGMA helped lower-ranking Coast Guard members pay for food and other expenses. Those with dependences received up to $1,000. The Coast Guard was the only military branch to go without pay during the shutdown because it is under the jurisdiction of the Department of Homeland Security and not the Department of Defense.

Programs 
CGMA provides assistance through a number of programs including the following:

 Child Care Grant
 In-Person Tutoring Grant
 Supplemental Special Needs Grant
 Child Care Loans
 Lost Wages Loans
Assisted Reproductive Services Loan

Governance
CGMA is governed by a board of directors called the Board of Control (BOC). The officers of the corporation include the Commandant of the Coast Guard, the Assistant Commandant for Human Resources, the Master Chief Petty Officer of the Coast Guard, and the executive director of CGMA. The members of the BOC who are elected represent the constituencies served by CGMA. Monthly meetings are held at Coast Guard Headquarters in Washington, DC, and members generally reside in the greater DC area.

History
 1924—The League of Coast Guard Women is founded
 1941—Coast Guard Welfare is established and assumes the League's mission
 1979—Name changes to Coast Guard Mutual Assistance
 1998—CGMA is incorporated in the Commonwealth of Virginia
 2005—CGMA distributes $3 million in direct aid to families affected by Hurricanes Katrina, Rita, and Wilma
 2017—CGMA distributes more than $2.6 million in direct aid to families affected by Hurricanes Harvey, Irma, and Maria, and provides $6.3 million in assistance to more than 5,200 Coast Guard families through interest-free loans and grants
 2018—CGMA provides $5.3 million in essential financial aid to more than 5,000 Coast Guard families

References

United States military support organizations
Non-profit organizations based in Arlington, Virginia
United States Coast Guard
United States Public Health Service